Hapur district is a recently formed district in the Indian state of Uttar Pradesh with a population of 1,338,211 at the 2011 Census.

History
The new district Panchsheel Nagar, was created from the tehsils of Hapur, Garhmukteshwar and Dhaulana (which were previously part of Ghaziabad district) as one of three new districts of Uttar Pradesh on 28 September 2011. U.P. Chief Minister Mayawati justified the decision by declaring that Ghaziabad district was "far too big for administrative efficiency", and that creating smaller districts conformed to the ideas proposed by social reformers B. R. Ambedkar and Jyotirao Phule.

The district was renamed from Panchsheel Nagar to Hapur district on 23 July 2012.  Hapur district is a part of Meerut division.

Government
It falls within the National Capital Region of India but comes under the state legislature of Uttar Pradesh.

Administrative divisions
Hapur district contains three Tehsils: Hapur, Garhmukteshwar and Dhaulana.

Demographics
The district population as the 2011 census was 1.3 million, which was split into 30% urban, 70% rural.

Economy
Major industries in the district are food processing, paper, textiles and steel tube production.

References

 
Districts of Uttar Pradesh
2011 establishments in Uttar Pradesh